Two Compositions (Trio) 1998 is a live album by American composer and saxophonist Anthony Braxton recorded at Wesleyan University in 1998 and released on the Leo label in 2003.

Reception
The Allmusic review by François Couture awarded the album 4½ stars stating "these two pieces illustrate how fascinatingly transparent his music can be. Highly recommended".

Track listing
All compositions by Anthony Braxton
Disc One:
 "Composition N. 227" - 55:56
Disc Two: 
 "Composition N. 228" - 49:16 
Recorded at Wesleyan University in Connecticut on April 17, 1998

Personnel
Anthony Braxton - alto saxophone, flute, clarinet, baritone saxophone, contrabass saxophone, contrabass clarinet 
Chris Jonas - soprano saxophone, alto saxophone, tenor saxophone  (Disc One)
David Novak - bassoon, contrabass bassoon (Disc One)
Jackson Moore - clarinet, alto saxophone, baritone saxophone (Disc Two)
Seth Misterka - alto saxophone, baritone saxophone (Disc Two)

References

Leo Records live albums
Anthony Braxton live albums
2003 live albums